In mathematics, a ternary cubic form is a homogeneous degree 3 polynomial in three variables.

Invariant theory

The ternary cubic is one of the few cases of a form of degree greater than 2 in more than 2 variables whose ring of invariants was calculated explicitly in the 19th century.

The ring of invariants

The algebra of invariants of a ternary cubic under SL3(C) is a polynomial algebra generated by two invariants S and T of degrees 4 and 6, called Aronhold invariants. The invariants are rather complicated when written as polynomials in the coefficients of the ternary cubic, and are given explicitly in

The ring of covariants

The ring of covariants is given as follows. 

The identity covariant U of a ternary cubic has degree 1 and order 3.

The Hessian H is a covariant of ternary cubics of degree 3 and order 3.

There is a covariant G of ternary cubics of degree 8 and order 6 that vanishes on  points x lying on the
Salmon conic of the polar of x with respect to the curve and its Hessian curve.

The Brioschi covariant J is the Jacobian of U, G, and H of degree 12, order 9.

The algebra of covariants of a ternary cubic is generated over the ring of invariants by U, G, H, and J, with a relation that the square of J is a polynomial in the other generators.

The ring of contravariants

The Clebsch transfer of the discriminant of a binary cubic is a contravariant F of ternary cubics of degree 4 and class 6, giving the dual cubic of a cubic curve.

The Cayleyan P of a ternary cubic is a contravariant of degree 3 and class 3.

The quippian Q of a ternary cubic is a contravariant of degree 5 and class 3.

The Hermite contravariant Π is another contravariant of ternary cubics of degree 12 and class 9.

The ring of contravariants is generated over the ring of invariants by F, P, Q, and Π, with a relation that Π2 is a polynomial in the other generators.

The ring of concomitants

 and  described the ring of concomitants, giving 34 generators.

The Clebsch transfer of the Hessian of a binary cubic is a concomitant of degree 2, order 2, and class 2.

The Clebsch transfer of the Jacobian of the identity covariant and the Hessian of a binary cubic is a concomitant of ternary cubics of degree 3, class 3, and order 3

See also

Ternary quartic
Invariants of a binary form

References

Invariant theory